Miroševce is a village in the municipality of Leskovac, Serbia. According to the 2011 census, the village has a population of 903 people.

References

Populated places in Jablanica District